Terry Sean Cousin (born March 11, 1975) is a former American football cornerback. He was signed by the Chicago Bears as an undrafted free agent in 1997. He played college football at South Carolina.

Cousin has also played for the Atlanta Falcons, Miami Dolphins, Carolina Panthers, New York Giants, Jacksonville Jaguars and Cleveland Browns.

Early years
Cousin attended Miami Beach High School in Miami Beach, Florida and was a student and  a letterman in football. in football, as a senior, he was named his team's Offensive M.V.P. and was a first-team All-Dade County selection.

College career
Cousin finished his collegiate career with 203 tackles and five interceptions for the University of South Carolina Gamecocks.

Professional career
Cousin was signed as a free agent in 1997 by the Chicago Bears. He played for the Atlanta Falcons, Miami Dolphins, Carolina Panthers, New York Giants and Jacksonville Jaguars.

On May 22, 2008, Cousin was signed by the Cleveland Browns, then on February 9, 2009, he was released by the Browns.

Post-football career
Cousin was formerly a student-athlete mentor at the University of South Carolina, his alma mater. He also served as the sideline reporter for the Gamecock Radio Network's coverage of Carolina Football, working with fellow former Gamecocks Todd Ellis (play-by-play) and Tommy Suggs (analyst), and can be seen on local television discussing the team.

Cousin worked as director of player development at South Carolina for two seasons, before becoming the director of player engagement with the Tampa Bay Buccaneers in 2012. In 2014, Cousin became the Bears' director of player engagement.

References

External links
Cleveland Browns bio
Jacksonville Jaguars bio

1975 births
Living people
Players of American football from Miami
American football cornerbacks
South Carolina Gamecocks football players
Chicago Bears players
Atlanta Falcons players
Miami Dolphins players
Carolina Panthers players
New York Giants players
Jacksonville Jaguars players
Cleveland Browns players